The 2018 Nokere Koerse was the 73rd edition of the Nokere Koerse road cycling one day race. It was held on 14 March 2018 as part of the UCI Europe Tour in category 1.HC.

Teams
Twenty-three teams of up to seven riders started the race:

Results

References 

Nokere Koerse
Nokere Koerse
Nokere Koerse